Rollover or roll over may refer to:

Arts and entertainment
 Rollover (film), a 1981 American political thriller
Roll Over, a 1992 album by Hound Dog
 "Roll Over", a 2006 song by Zico Chain
 "Roll Over", a 1989 song by Steven Wayne Horton
 "Roll Over" (Thompson Twins song), 1985

Computing
 Rollover (key), the ability of a computer keyboard to handle several simultaneous keystrokes
 Rollover cable, a cable used to connect a computer to a router

Finance
 Rollover (finance)
 Rollover (foreign exchange)
 Rollover IRA, a type of individual retirement account in the U.S.

Other uses
 Rollover (fire), a stage of a structure fire
 Rollover, the former name of Gilchrist, Texas, U.S.
Rollover Pass
 Roll Over, a park ride by Mondial (amusement ride manufacturer)
 Dynamic rollover, a helicopter's susceptibility to roll when close to the ground
 Vehicle rollover, a type of vehicular crash in which a vehicle tips over onto its side or roof

See also

 Roll (disambiguation)
"Roll Over Beethoven", a 1956 song by Chuck Berry
 Integer overflow, when an arithmetic operation attempts to create a numeric value that is outside of the range that can be represented with a given number of digits